Wilard High School is a public high school located in Willard, Missouri, United States. The school is in the Willard R-2 School District.

Athletics
Willard High School's official mascot is the tiger. Willard is part of the Central Ozark Conference (COC) Large Division.

Baseball - JV baseball owner Glendale High School 
Basketball – Men & Women
Cross country – Men & Women
Football
Golf – Men & Women
Soccer - Men & Women
Track and field – Men & Women
Volleyball – Women
Wrestling - Men
NJROTC - Co-ed
Marching band - Men & Women

Notable alumni

  – 1992 Olympics bronze medalist

References

External links
Willard H.S.

Public high schools in Missouri
Schools in Greene County, Missouri
Educational institutions established in 1922
1922 establishments in Missouri